The French are a British rock band, formed by Darren Hayman and John Morrison after the band Hefner declared an indefinite hiatus. Musically there is a specific continuity between Hefner and the French, which is manifested not only in the lyrics and compositions but also in the use of vintage drum machines and synthesizers, an aesthetic choice that was very present in Hefner's last recordings.

The French released one album, Local Information, on Too Pure in 2003. Their most recent work together was a John Peel session in August 2004. Since then Darren Hayman has been involved in a legal dispute with Too Pure, and has subsequently launched a solo career. He intends to re-release Local Information and possibly other material by the French. Like Hefner before them, the French are now on an indefinite hiatus.

Discography

Albums
 Local Information (2003)

Singles and EPs
 "Dagenham" (2003)
 "Porn Shoes" (2003)

References

External links
 2005 interview with Darren Hayman touching on the future prospects for the French

English rock music groups